Lieinix is a genus of butterflies in the subfamily Dismorphiinae. It is native to the Americas.

Species
 Lieinix christa (Reissinger, 1970)
 Lieinix cinerascens (Salvin, 1871) – bluish mimic-white
 Lieinix lala (Godman & Salvin, 1889) – dark mimic-white
 Lieinix neblina J. Maza & R.G. Maza, 1984 – Guerrero mimic-white
 Lieinix nemesis (Latreille, [1813]) – frosted mimic-white
 Lieinix viridifascia (Butler, 1872) – greenish mimic-white

References

External links

 
 
Images representing Lieinix at Consortium for the Barcode of Life

Dismorphiinae
Pieridae of South America
Pieridae genera
Taxa named by George Robert Gray